Victoire Van Nuffel (born 7 October 1937) is a Belgian former racing cyclist. She won the Belgian national road race title in 1959.

References

External links

1937 births
Living people
Belgian female cyclists
Sportspeople from Mechelen
Cyclists from Antwerp Province